Tony Lee (born 1970) is a British comics writer.

Tony Lee may also refer to:

Tony Lee (actor), American actor
Anthony Lee (actor) (1961–2000), American actor
Tony Lee (pianist) (1934–2004), British jazz musician
Tony Lee (footballer, born 1937) (born 1937), English footballer with Southport in the 1950s
Tony Lee (footballer, born 1947) (born 1947), English footballer with Bradford City and Darlington in the 1960s, later a non-league football manager
Tony Lee (basketball) (born 1986), American basketball player

See also 
Tony Lee Bettenhausen, Champ Car owner and driver
Tony Harris (basketball, born 1970) (Tony Lee Harris, 1970–2007), American basketball player
Tony Lee Moral, documentary writer and film maker